The Perth Amboy Ferry Slip, located on the Arthur Kill in Perth Amboy, Middlesex County, New Jersey, United States, was once a vital ferry slip for boats in New York Harbor.
It was added to the New Jersey Register of Historic Places and  National Register of Historic Places in 1978. The ferry slip was restored in 1998 to its 1904 appearance. A replica of the ticket office has been constructed and is used as a small museum.

History
Perth Amboy is located at the mouth of the Raritan River at the Raritan Bay, an arm of the Lower New York Bay. Perth Amboy served as New Jersey's capital from 1686 until 1776. In 1684, it became the capital of East Jersey and remained so after the union of East and West Jersey in 1702, becoming an alternate colonial capital with Burlington until 1776. Ferry service at the site dates back to 1684. During the colonial era and for a long thereafter, Perth Amboy was an important way-station for travel between New York City and Philadelphia, providing the waterways used by the ferry service originally set up by Cornelius Vanderbilt, who later became known as "The Commodore". The slip was later used to transport newly arrived immigrants from Ellis Island, many of whom remained in the town.

The native Lenape provided crossings to settlers as early as 1680.
The longest-running ferry service crossed the Arthur Kill to  Tottenville, Staten Island, with regular service beginning in 1709 or 1719 operated by Christopher Billopp. Steam service was introduced late 19th century by the Baltimore and Ohio Railroad and ran until 1943, and was served by the Staten Island Railway at the Tottenville station. In the early motoring age the ferry was an important link for travelers to the Jersey Shore It became less important with the 1928 opening of the Outerbridge Crossing, but continued operating until October 17, 1963.

Gallery

See also
 National Register of Historic Places listings in Middlesex County, New Jersey
 New Jersey Coastal Heritage Trail Route
 List of ferries across the Hudson River to New York City
 Gibbons v. Ogden

References

External links 

Tottenville history
 Perth Amboy Ferry Slip Museum - Facebook site
Roots Web Perth Amboy photos 
Wikimapia
Tottenville Memories

Transport infrastructure completed in 1904
Ferry terminals in New Jersey
Perth Amboy, New Jersey
Transportation buildings and structures on the National Register of Historic Places in New Jersey
Pre-statehood history of New Jersey
Tourist attractions in Middlesex County, New Jersey
Transportation buildings and structures in Middlesex County, New Jersey
Museums in Middlesex County, New Jersey
Baltimore and Ohio Railroad
National Register of Historic Places in Middlesex County, New Jersey
New Jersey Register of Historic Places
Ferry terminals on the National Register of Historic Places